Hunterstown Rovers is a Gaelic football (GAA) club located in Ardee, County Louth, Ireland. The club's pitch is located about 3 kilometres south of Ardee on the main Dublin-Derry Road (N2). Hunterstown has teams at all age levels starting from U5's through to senior level.

History
The club was founded in 1941. After challenge matches against the O'Mahony's and Collon, the club affiliated with the Louth County Board in 1941, playing their first competitive match in March of that season in the Second Division Championship at Dunleer. They won this match, against St. Colmcille's, Togher, on a scoreline of 2-4 to nil.  In their next outing however, Hunterstown lost in Dunleer.  In that season, Rovers won their section of the Ranafast Cup only to fail to Kilcurry in the competition's semi-final stages.
 
From 1940 to 1980, Hunterstown played their football in a field owned by the Duffy family, close by the Travellers Rest.  Because of its rather restricted size, it became known as the "Cabbage Field". Many visiting teams failed to come to terms with the pitch's pronounced slope.
 
At the club's 1980 A.G.M. it was decided to investigate the possibility of acquiring a permanent and suitable location. Later it was decided that the most desirable property was a spacious field adjoining the already existing clubrooms. This was owned by the Lynch family and within a short period of time negotiations were opened and completed. Early in 1983 the first game on the new grounds was a Ranafast Cup meeting of Rovers and Sean McDermott's. The meeting of Monaghan and Louth officially opened the brand new Pairc Baile Fiach in July 1984.

The first jerseys in 1941 were navy blue/sky blue vertical stripes. Hunterstown played in the Cardinal O’Donnell Cup in 1946. The first success at County Board level came in 1954 when Hunterstown won both the 2nd Division Championship and Ranafast Cup beating Lannleire in both finals at the Grove, Castlebellingham.

The club was represented by Ollie Reilly on the winning Louth team in the 1957 All-Ireland Senior Football Championship Final.

Rovers achieved senior status for the first time by winning the Louth Intermediate Football Championship in 1993. The club has most recently enjoyed successes in the Louth Junior Football Championship (2013) and the Louth Division 3 League (2012) and has competed in the Leinster Junior Club Football Championship a lot which can be attributed to new hot shot Ryan Burns, who was a part of the Louth team that won the Allianz Division 4 league in 2016. In November 2016, Jim Matthews was appointed as manager of the Senior football team.

Honours
Leinster Junior Club Football Championship (0): Runners-Up 2013
Louth Intermediate Football Championship (2): 1993, 1999
Louth Junior Football Championship (4): 1959, 1987, 2013 
Louth Division 2 League (2): 1954, 2001
Louth Division 3 League (2): 1982, 2012 
Ranafast Cup (1): 1954
Old Gaels Cup (1): 1991

References

External links
Hunterstownrovers.gaa.ie

Gaelic games clubs in County Louth
Gaelic football clubs in County Louth